"Six Blocks Away" is a song written and performed by American singer-songwriter Lucinda Williams. It was released in 1992 as the first single from her fourth album, Sweet Old World (1992).

Williams re-recorded Sweet Old World for its 25th anniversary in 2017, and released it under the new title This Sweet Old World. "Six Blocks Away" was again released as the lead single, and Rolling Stone described the re-recorded version as "reinvigorated with a chiming, jangly Rickenbacker guitar line that evokes everyone from Tom Petty to the Byrds to R.E.M."

Critical reception
LA Weekly ranked "Six Blocks Away" at No. 9 on their list of Williams' best 11 songs, calling it "one of her best jangle pop/country songs" while observing "the song's lyrics offer none of the music's bright optimism. Perhaps that is why the track works so well." Rolling Stone described it as a "near-pop single", writing "Duane Jarvis's and Gurf Morlix's guitars jangle through the mix, though Williams's singing colors with a rural Louisiana rawness."

Track listing
US CD single
 "Six Blocks Away" (Radio Edit) – 2:48

Australia CD single
 "Six Blocks Away" – 2:52
 "Which Will" – 3:49

Chart performance

References

External links
, official audio (no music video)

1992 songs
1992 singles
2017 singles
Lucinda Williams songs
Songs written by Lucinda Williams